"Remedy" is a song by English recording artist Little Boots from her debut studio album, Hands (2009). Written by Little Boots and RedOne, the song was released as the album's second single on 15 June 2009 in Japan and on 17 August 2009 in the United Kingdom, becoming Little Boots' most successful single on the UK Singles Chart. A remix EP of the song was also made available on the US iTunes Store on 8 December 2009.

Background and writing
Little Boots composed "Remedy" in Los Angeles with RedOne over a two-day period. She initially found working with RedOne intimidating because their collaboration was expected to produce a hit song. According to Little Boots, "Remedy" "is about dancing and music being a remedy to some kind of poison in your life. I wanted to write a dark dance pop song a bit like Britney Spears' 'Toxic'. The lyrics are not really very personal, I was more imagining a situation."

Critical reception
"Remedy" received positive reviews from music critics. David Balls wrote for Digital Spy that the song "has all the right ingredients to steer the good ship Boots towards safer seas. It's got a big synthy intro, a bombastic chorus reminiscent of late eighties Kylie, and best of all a sparkling and kaleidoscopic middle 8 that's one of the finest pop moments of the year."

The Guardians Alexis Petridis stated the track "takes her love of continental pop's shameless melodicism to a saccharine extreme and winds up sounding less like a cool Giorgio Moroder-inspired Italo disco track than something a former Soviet Republic might submit to Eurovision."  Emily Mackay of NME magazine called the song "run-of-the-mill." Pitchfork Media reviewer Marc Hogan wrote that while "RedOne lends generic club-rap swagger", he does not find the song convincing.

Commercial performance
"Remedy" made its debut on the UK Singles Chart at number thirty-three for the week ending 8 August 2009. Due to strong digital downloads, the song managed to climb to number fourteen the following week, selling 12,375 copies. In its fourth week, "Remedy" rose to its peak position of number six, making it Little Boots' highest-charting single to date. In Ireland, "Remedy" debuted at number thirty-one on the Irish Singles Chart for the week of 30 July 2009, ultimately peaking at number five on 10 September 2009.

Music video
Directed by David Wilson, the music video for "Remedy" was filmed in London and was described by Little Boots as "much more conceptual and pretty much more me" than the video for "New in Town". It features Little Boots dressed in a silver outfit, playing several keyboards and the Tenori-on. Scenes of Little Boots singing to the camera are intercut with scenes of kaleidoscopic geometric patterns and flashing strobe lights. This music video is not available to view on YouTube in the United States.

Track listings

 UK CD single
 "Remedy" – 3:19

 UK 7-inch single
A1. "Remedy"
B1. "Love Kills"

 UK 12-inch single
A1. "Remedy" (Rusko's Big Trainers Remix)
B1. "Remedy" (Style of Eye Remix)

 UK and Japanese iTunes EP
 "Remedy" (Kaskade Club Remix) – 6:02
 "Remedy" (Wideboys Stadium Radio Edit) – 3:33
 "Remedy" (Disco Bloodbath Remix) – 6:07
 "Remedy" (Crazy Cousinz Remix) [Revised] – 4:05
 "Remedy" (Rusko's Big Trainers Remix) – 4:27
 "Remedy" (Stonemasons Club Remix) – 7:41

 US iTunes EP – Remixes
 "Remedy" (Kaskade Club Remix) – 5:59
 "Remedy" (Stonemasons Club Remix) – 7:41
 "Remedy" (Avicii Club Mix) – 7:12

 Japanese iTunes single
 "Remedy" (Radio Edit) – 3:19
 "Love Kills" – 3:41

Charts

Weekly charts

Year-end charts

Certifications

Release history

References

2009 singles
2009 songs
679 Artists singles
Atlantic Records singles
Elektra Records singles
Little Boots songs
Song recordings produced by RedOne
Songs written by Little Boots
Songs written by RedOne